The sural arteries (inferior muscular arteries) are two large branches, lateral and medial, which are distributed to the gastrocnemius, soleus, and plantaris muscles. Sural means related to the calf.     The term applies to any of four or five arteries arising from the popliteal artery, with distribution to the muscles and integument of the calf, and with anastomoses to the posterior tibial, medial and lateral inferior genicular arteries.

References

External links

Arteries of the lower limb